Mikkel Frølich Honoré (born 21 January 1997) is a Danish cyclist, who currently rides for UCI WorldTeam . In May 2019, he was named in the startlist for the 2019 Giro d'Italia.

Major results

2014
 1st  Overall Sint-Martinusprijs Kontich
1st  Young rider classification
 Summer Youth Olympics
1st Time trial
2nd Team race
2015
 1st  Overall Sint-Martinusprijs Kontich
1st Stage 1 (TTT)
 3rd Overall Trophée Centre Morbihan
1st Stage 1
 4th Trofeo Comune di Vertova
 7th Paris–Roubaix Juniors
2017
 8th Liège–Bastogne–Liège U23
 8th Ronde van Vlaanderen Beloften
 10th Piccolo Giro di Lombardia
2018
 1st Circuit de Wallonie
 1st Stage 4 (TTT) Tour de l'Avenir
 4th Overall Istrian Spring Trophy
 5th Ghent–Wevelgem U23
 10th Eschborn–Frankfurt Under-23
2019
 10th Overall Adriatica Ionica Race
2020
 1st Stage 1b (TTT) Settimana Internazionale di Coppi e Bartali
 7th Classic Sud-Ardèche
2021
 1st Stage 5 Tour of the Basque Country
 2nd Overall Settimana Internazionale di Coppi e Bartali
1st Stage 5
 2nd Druivenkoers Overijse
 3rd Clásica de San Sebastián
 3rd Bretagne Classic
 3rd Royal Bernard Drôme Classic
 4th Overall Tour of Britain
 4th Classic Sud-Ardèche
 4th Primus Classic
 5th Road race, National Road Championships
 5th Overall Tour de Pologne
2022
 3rd Road race, National Road Championships
 6th Grand Prix Cycliste de Québec
2023
 1st  Mountains classification, Tour Down Under

Grand Tour general classification results timeline

Classics results timeline

References

External links

1997 births
Living people
Danish male cyclists
People from Fredericia
Sportspeople from the Region of Southern Denmark